Brasil Animado is a 2011 Brazilian animated comedy film directed by Mariana Caltabiano. The film is based on As Aventuras de Gui & Estopa, an animated series created by Caltabiano.

The movie combines the use of live action and traditional animation, a technique used in films like  Who Framed Roger Rabbit and Space Jam. This is the first Brazilian movie completely produced with 3D technology.

Plot 
A couple of dogs called Stress and Relax leave in search for the Cariniana legalis, the oldest tree of Brazil. They are not sure what city the tree is. While Relax thinks only about having fun and get to know the culture of different parts of Brazil, Stress becomes increasingly eager to find the tree  as he hopes to get rich selling souvenirs of it.

Cast 
 Eduardo Jardim 
 Fernando Meirelles
 Daiane dos Santos
 Ariel Wollinger
 Mariana Caltabiano

Production 
Filming took place between October 31, 2009 and December 3, 2010. Part of the animation was produced by Mariana Caltabiano Criações and TeleImage, while the live-action was recorded in the studios of Globo Filmes. The footage was shot in Rio de Janeiro, Salvador, São Paulo, Foz do Iguaçu, Ouro Preto, Gramado, Brasília, Florianópolis and other cities.

References

External links
  
 

2011 films
2011 3D films
3D animated films
Animated comedy films
Brazilian 3D films
Brazilian animated films
Brazilian children's films
Brazilian comedy films
Flash animated films
Films with live action and animation
Films shot in Fortaleza
Films shot in Foz do Iguaçu
Films shot in Ouro Preto
Films shot in Rio de Janeiro (city)
Films shot in Rio Grande do Sul
Films shot in Salvador, Bahia
Films shot in Santa Catarina (state)
Films shot in São Paulo
2010s Portuguese-language films